The buff-banded tyrannulet (Mecocerculus hellmayri) is a species of bird in the family Tyrannidae. It is found in Argentina, Bolivia, and Peru. Its natural habitat is subtropical or tropical moist montane forests.

References

buff-banded tyrannulet
Birds of the Bolivian Andes
buff-banded tyrannulet
Taxonomy articles created by Polbot